Siimusti is a small borough in Jõgeva Parish, Jõgeva County in eastern Estonia.

References

External links 
 Satellite map at Maplandia.com

Boroughs and small boroughs in Estonia
Kreis Fellin